Chippenham by-election may refer to one of two parliamentary by-elections held for the British House of Commons constituency of Chippenham, in Wiltshire:

 1943 Chippenham by-election
 1962 Chippenham by-election

See also
 Chippenham constituency
 List of United Kingdom by-elections